The 1924–25 season was Arsenal's sixth season in the top division of English football.

Results
Arsenal's score comes first

Legend

Football League First Division

Final League table

FA Cup

Arsenal entered the FA Cup in the first round proper, in which they were drawn to face West Ham United.

London FA Challenge Cup

See also

 1924–25 in English football
 List of Arsenal F.C. seasons

References

English football clubs 1924–25 season
1924-25